Don McGuire (died March 2020) was an American television sports executive. He was executive producer at Turner Sports' TBS and TNT, Raycom Sports, and The Golf Channel. He won multiple Emmy, Cine and CableAce awards and was executive producer for the startup of Raycom Sports in 1983. He also oversaw the fast growth of Ted Turner's sports TV operations from 1987 to 1995 as Executive Producer and then Senior VP. He served as executive producer at the Golf Channel from 1999 to 2000 and was senior vice president for programming and production at the Golf Channel when the channel became the exclusive cable outlet for the LPGA and PGA Tour.

Career

ABC Sports
McGuire started his career as an announcer on radio in Albuquerque, New Mexico. He was discovered by Dick Ebersol while Ebersol was at ABC Sports in 1974 and was one of three finalists for ABC's NCAA Football sideline reporter position, eventually given to Jim Lampley and Don Tollefson.

NBC Sports and Raycom Sports
McGuire joined NBC Sports in 1978, hired by executive producer Don Ohlmeyer to both produce and be talent on Olympic features for the 1980 Moscow Olympics McGuire soon became producer of studio shows for NBC including NCAA basketball and NFL 78 and 79, hosted by Bryant Gumbel McGuire left NBC after that network lost TV rights to the NCAA Basketball Championships but was the feature producer in 1979 on the highest-rated college game ever, the Magic Johnson versus Larry Bird championship between Michigan State and Indiana State.
McGuire is featured in Seth Davis' book "When March Went Mad" about the Bird/Johnson game in 1979.
For NBC, McGuire produced the telecast of the history-making heavyweight fight in Johannesburg between Gerry Coetzee and Randy Stephens- the first competition between a black man and a white man in South Africa. He was coordinating producer for the 1979 US Olympic Festival and all the 1980 US Olympic Trials events.

McGuire helped start Raycom Sports in 1983 producing hundreds of college football and basketball games yearly for syndication.

Turner Sports
In 1987, he was hired by Robert Wussler to be executive producer of TBS Sports. He was executive producer on the 1992 and 1994 Winter Olympics, the 1991 Pan American Games from Havana, Cuba, the 1990 World Cup from Italy and the 1994 Goodwill Games from St Petersburg Russia. Under McGuire's operational direction Turner Sports added the NBA, NFL, PGA and Grand Slam Golf. He was senior executive for sports on the launch of TNT and in the launch of SportSouth. He created the first live, onsite football pregame show—The Silver Bullet Stadium Show—before NFL on TNT broadcasts.

He was the executive who first hired Doug Collins, Hubie Brown, Chuck Daly, Don Sutton, Ernie Johnson, Jr, Magic Johnson and Charles Barkley at TNT.

McGuire consulted to Golf Channel founder Joe Gibbs in 1995 on the launch of that network and subsequently served as executive producer and later senior vice president for programming, production and operations until the network was taken over by Comcast.

References

Year of birth missing
2020 deaths
American television executives